Rassat may refer to:
Rassat, Minnesota
Thierry Rassat